Falkenstein is a municipality in the Donnersbergkreis district, in Rhineland-Palatinate, Germany. The castle was the seat of the Counts of Falkenstein.

History
In 1255, the Counts of Falkenstein inherited territories of extinct Hagen-Munzenberg. In 1418, the line died out, the territory was passed to Lords of Eppstein and Counts of Solms. Later the Solms portion passed to Isenburg-Budingen by female inheritance. In 1647, there was a siege, shelling and storming of the castle by the French. In 1654 Falkensteiners stormed the building and shot the Lorraine commander Weingart. The last Count of Falkenstein, William Wirich, sold 1667, the impoverished county to the Duke of Lorraine. In 1736 the Imperial House of Habsburg possessed the county through the marriage of Francis Stephen of Lorraine with Maria Theresia. In 1816 Falkenstein was transferred along with the rest of Pfalz to Kingdom of Bavaria as a result of decisions taken at the Congress of Vienna agreements.

References

Municipalities in Rhineland-Palatinate
Donnersbergkreis